Willie Bethea (born c. 1939) was a Canadian football player who played for the Hamilton Tiger-Cats. He won the Grey Cup with them in 1963, 1965 and 1967. Prior to his CFL career he played football in Paterson, New Jersey and attended Rider University. He was inducted into the Hamilton Tiger-Cats Wall of Honour in 2012.

References

1930s births
Hamilton Tiger-Cats players
Rider University alumni
Living people
Canadian football running backs
Players of American football from New Jersey